Stig Roland Stoltz (born 15 August 1954) is a retired Swedish ice hockey player who played fourteen games for the Washington Capitals of the National Hockey League during the 1981–82 NHL season. He also has 21 appearances in the Swedish national team to his credit, and played in the team that took the silver medal in the 1981 World Ice Hockey Championships.

Stoltz should not be confused with the older Swedish ice hockey defenceman with the same name.

External links

1954 births
Living people
Swedish ice hockey forwards
Swedish expatriate ice hockey players in the United States
Undrafted National Hockey League players
Washington Capitals players
Skellefteå AIK players
People from Överkalix Municipality
Sportspeople from Norrbotten County